Abeyratne or Abeyrathne is a Sinhalese surname. People with this surname include:
Anoka Primrose Abeyrathne, Lankan conservationist, social entrepreneur, and activist
 Damitha Abeyratne (born 1975), Sri Lankan film actor
Kasun Abeyrathne (born 1998), Sri Lankan cricketer
 Lasith Abeyratne (born 1993), Sri Lankan cricketer
 Purnima Abeyratne, Sri Lankan Dress Designer
 Sherine Abeyratne, Australian female singer (member of Big Pig)
 Zan Abeyratne, Australian female singer (member of I'm Talking)

Sinhalese surnames